Auroa is a locality in southern Taranaki, New Zealand. Ōpunake is to the west, Kaponga to the northeast, and Manaia to the southeast. Mount Taranaki is directly north of Auroa.

The New Zealand Ministry for Culture and Heritage gives a translation of "long cloud" for Auroa.

Demographics
Auroa is in two SA1 statistical areas which cover . The SA1 areas are part of the larger Taungatara statistical area.

The SA1 areas had a population of 270 at the 2018 New Zealand census, a decrease of 21 people (−7.2%) since the 2013 census, and a decrease of 27 people (−9.1%) since the 2006 census. There were 99 households, comprising 132 males and 135 females, giving a sex ratio of 0.98 males per female, with 57 people (21.1%) aged under 15 years, 66 (24.4%) aged 15 to 29, 126 (46.7%) aged 30 to 64, and 24 (8.9%) aged 65 or older.

Ethnicities were 87.8% European/Pākehā, 11.1% Māori, 2.2% Pacific peoples, 2.2% Asian, and 2.2% other ethnicities. People may identify with more than one ethnicity.

Although some people chose not to answer the census's question about religious affiliation, 48.9% had no religion, 38.9% were Christian, 1.1% had Māori religious beliefs, and 1.1% were Buddhist.

Of those at least 15 years old, 21 (9.9%) people had a bachelor's or higher degree, and 54 (25.4%) people had no formal qualifications. 39 people (18.3%) earned over $70,000 compared to 17.2% nationally. The employment status of those at least 15 was that 123 (57.7%) people were employed full-time, 33 (15.5%) were part-time, and 6 (2.8%) were unemployed.

Taungatara statistical area

Taungatara had a population of 1,326 at the 2018 New Zealand census, a decrease of 54 people (−3.9%) since the 2013 census, and a decrease of 105 people (−7.3%) since the 2006 census. There were 456 households, comprising 702 males and 624 females, giving a sex ratio of 1.12 males per female. The median age was 32.0 years (compared with 37.4 years nationally), with 357 people (26.9%) aged under 15 years, 270 (20.4%) aged 15 to 29, 603 (45.5%) aged 30 to 64, and 96 (7.2%) aged 65 or older.

Ethnicities were 89.4% European/Pākehā, 18.3% Māori, 0.9% Pacific peoples, 2.7% Asian, and 1.1% other ethnicities. People may identify with more than one ethnicity.

The percentage of people born overseas was 8.1, compared with 27.1% nationally.

Although some people chose not to answer the census's question about religious affiliation, 49.5% had no religion, 38.7% were Christian, 1.4% had Māori religious beliefs, 0.7% were Hindu, 0.2% were Muslim, 0.5% were Buddhist and 0.9% had other religions.

Of those at least 15 years old, 123 (12.7%) people had a bachelor's or higher degree, and 228 (23.5%) people had no formal qualifications. The median income was $38,600, compared with $31,800 nationally. 174 people (18.0%) earned over $70,000 compared to 17.2% nationally. The employment status of those at least 15 was that 588 (60.7%) people were employed full-time, 156 (16.1%) were part-time, and 27 (2.8%) were unemployed.

Otakeho 
Otakeho is a part of the Taungatara statistical area, to the south of Auroa and west of the Otakeho Stream (rising on Mount Taranaki and reaching the Tasman Sea at Otakeho), on SH45. It has a hall (built in 1897 to celebrate Queen Victoria's Diamond Jubilee), a boarded up store (probably built about 1920) and a few houses. To the west of Otakeho is Ngāruahine's Tawhitinui Marae.

It is used for fishing and has a poorly protected, nationally threatened, variety of Craspedia, Craspedia Otakeho.

It once also had a school (1884-2003 - the buildings remain), a Category 2 listed church (sold in 2018 and moved to Pihama in 2021), an hotel (rebuilt after a 1907 fire and since burnt down again), a post office, a smithy and a dairy factory, which occupied several buildings.

The Ōpunake to New Plymouth bus runs through Otakeho daily in each direction, except at weekends.

Education
Auroa School is a coeducational full primary (years 1-8) school with a roll of  students as of  Schools at Pihama, Riverlea and Te Kiri were closed and merged into Auroa School in 2004.

Association Football
The Auroa Association Football club was formed in May 1907. After the First World War the club re-emerged with two sides. A story of an Auroa player who covered nearly 20 miles on a ladies bicycle in just over an hour to deliver a misplaced bag to the Hawera train station appeared in the local newspaper in 1923. In 1924 Mr. W. Brown from Auroa captained Taranaki against Chinese Universities at Hawera's Showgrounds. In 1926 Auroa won the Taranaki Championship and Julian Cup. In 1927 Mr. Freakley from Auroa captained Taranaki against Canada at New Plymouth's Pukekura Park.

References

Further reading

General historical works

Clubs and organisations

Schools

South Taranaki District
Populated places in Taranaki